Hendrick ten Oever (1639 – 1716), was a Dutch Golden Age painter.

Biography
He was born in Zwolle as the son of David ten Oever and Marijke Molkenbuer. His earliest dated work is from 1657 and is a portrait of Rabo Herman Schele, a gentleman from Overijssel. The work is strongly related to the portraits painted by Eva van Marle.

According to the RKD he was a pupil of Eva van Marle in Zwolle before travelling to Amsterdam in 1659 where he took lessons from his cousin Cornelis de Bie along with the brothers Johan Heinrich and Theodor Roos. He is considered to be a member of the Pieter de Hooch school of genre painting, along with Esaias Boursse, Hendrick van der Burgh, Pieter Janssens Elinga, Cornelis de Man, and Jacob Vrel.

In 1665 he was back in Zwolle where he lived on the Sassenstraat across from Gesina ter Borch. In 1675 he married Geertruidt van der Horst there and they had 4 children. He is known for landscapes and cityscapes as well as portraits.

References

 
Hendrick ten Oever on Artnet

1639 births
1716 deaths
Dutch Golden Age painters
Dutch male painters
People from Zwolle